Second Husband is a radio soap opera in the United States.

The program told "[t]he dramatic story of Brenda Cummings and the problems that arise within her family when she marries Grant Cummings, her second husband." Widow Brenda's marriage to wealthy Grant Cummings produced problems on two levels—her son and daughter didn't want to accept Grant as their new father, and Brenda wanted a career as a movie actress, which Grant opposed.

Second Husband was one of 35 radio series – many of them soap operas – produced by the husband-and-wife team Frank and Anne Hummert from 1931 through 1960. The conflict regarding Brenda Cummings' desire for a career in movies resembled the situation of Mary Noble in another Hummert program, Backstage Wife.

Star

Helen Menken, who was the first actress to play Brenda Cummings, was a veteran of Broadway plays when the show began. She first appeared in a Broadway production at age 3 and was in another when she was 5. Menken progressed to more substantial roles by the time she was a teenager and "[t]hrough the mid-1920s, she presented a string of powerful performances in challenging dramas." Thus, a newspaper article about Second Husband advised readers: "The series will afford Miss Menken the opportunity of displaying her versatility and acting genius and will enable you radio dialers to hear one of the theater's brilliant actresses in a gripping role."

A 1939 magazine article about Second Husband described Menken as "a perfectionist, which probably accounts for the fact that she is one of the few stars of stage or screen who has been able to make and retain an equal success on the air."

Menken's personal life mirrored her role in the program to an extent, because when the show aired she was married to her second husband. Thus, her real-life experience sometimes affected her work on Second Husband. As an example, she told one reporter, "It wasn't until after my second wedding that I realized what I had missed in not wearing a lovely, flowing, white wedding gown." After acknowledging her sentimental nature, she continued: "When my wedding scene ... came into the script, I went out and bought a beautiful wedding gown. And I was married over the air in it. The way I had always wanted to be married in real life. It was beautiful."

The star's stage experience might also have influenced how the program was broadcast. That same article noted, "Broadcasting Second Husband is almost like putting on a regular stage play, with the curtain rising at the beginning of the show and falling at its end, and all the actors taking curtain calls in response to applause."

Cross-marketing with magazine
Cross-marketing, in which each of two entities promotes the other's product or service, was used to the mutual benefit of radio programs and magazines in the era of old-time radio. Radio historian Elena Razlogova wrote: "The networks and magazines perfected the cross-marketing common among department stores, newspapers, movies, pulps, slicks and comic strips in this period [the 1930s]. Editors and program producers synchronized print and on-air tie-ins.

Second Husband and Radio and Television Mirror magazine exemplified such cross-marketing. The magazine's January 1940 issue carried the first installment of a serial titled "Second Husband." A headline deck on the story's opening spread introduced the serial as follows: "Beginning in intimate diary form, the vivid story of a young mother who thought it was no crime to love and marry again – based on the popular radio serial of the same name."

People at the magazine and the program coordinated promotion of efforts related to the tie-ins. Razlogova cited one example, when the magazine printed a full-page portrait of Brenda Cummings that was promoted on the radio show, "giving the listener no opportunity to miss either event." She added, "Thanks to such precisely orchestrated campaigns, radio shows boosted their ratings while fan magazines jacked up their circulation."

Broadcast schedule

Sterling's products advertised on Second Husband were primarily Bayer Aspirin, Dr. Lyons Tooth Powder and Phillips' Milk of Magnesia.

Cast
Cast members were as follows:

Others in the cast were Lois Hall, James Meighan, Colleen Ward, Virginia Dwyer, Nancy Bashein, John Thomas, Skippy Homeier, Peter Donald and Stefan Schnabel. The orchestra leader was Vic Arden.

References

External links
"Second Husband" story (based on the radio program) in the January 1940 issue of Radio and Television Mirror magazine

1930s American radio programs
1940s American radio programs
American radio soap operas
NBC radio programs
NBC Blue Network radio programs
CBS Radio programs